Thomas Gordon may refer to:
 Thomas Gordon (lawyer) (1652–1722), American lawyer and politician of the colonial period
 Thomas Gordon (Royal Scots Navy officer) (c. 1658–1741), Commodore in the Royal Scots Navy and then Admiral and Commander-in-Chief at Kronstadt of the Imperial Russian navy
 Thomas Gordon (writer) (c. 1691–1750), British writer
 Thomas Gordon (philosopher) (1714–1797), Scottish philosopher and antiquarian
 Thomas Gordon (British Army officer) (1788–1841), British army officer and historian
 Thomas Boston Gordon (1816–1891), civil war captain, lawyer and judge from Kentucky
 Thomas Edward Gordon (1832–1914), British traveller, author of a book about 19th-century Kashgaria
 Thomas Gisborne Gordon (1851–1935), Ireland rugby player
 Thomas Gordon (Australian politician) (1882–1949), Australian politician and businessman
 Thomas S. Gordon (1893–1959), U.S. Representative from Illinois
 Thomas C. Gordon (1915–2003), Virginia state supreme court justice
 Thomas Gordon (psychologist) (1918–2002), American clinical psychologist
 Thomas P. Gordon (born 1952), American politician and law enforcement expert
 Thomas Gordon (bishop), Presiding Bishop of the Orthodox Anglican Church and Metropolitan Archbishop
 Thomas Gordon (rugby union) (born 1997), Scottish rugby union player
 Thomas David Gordon (born 1954), professor and theologian
 Tom Gordon (born 1967), American baseball player
 Tom Gordon (priest) (born 1957), Dean of Leighlin
 Tom Gordon (politician), member of the Arizona House of Representatives

Fictional characters
Thomas Gordon, a character from the Ghost Whisperer

See also
Gordon Thomas (disambiguation)